5Five is a Ghanaian hiplife music group formed in 2005 by Luther Azamati (Papi 5Five) and Jeffery Opoku Agyekum (Killy) and later a third member joined with stage name Juno, the group is now defunct.

Background 
5Five became a household name in Ghana after their song African Gurlz won two awards at the Ghana Music Awards in 2008. The group was formed in Adabraka a suburb of Accra. Their debut single was Bull (4 Better 4 Worse) was released in 2005, and then did a remix of it with Batman Samini now Samini was done and put on the Appietus compilation.

Discography

Singles 
 African Gurlz
 Move Back (Mujebaya) feat Appietus
 Number One Fan
 Pretty Girl
 Gargantuan Body
 Bossu Kena
 Lamiorkor
 Shorty
 Tinkolon
 Uhm Ahh
 Party

Albums 
 Move Back

Awards and nominations

Controversy with Appietus 
Papi 5Five a member of 5Five and Appietus was engaged in an exchange of words on radio and tv over copyright infringements Appietus has allegedly engaged in against 5Five on their song Move Back (Mujebaya) and a few others. Appietus claimed in an interview on Citi TV that he wasn't paid hence allowing his DSPs to upload the song on music streaming websites on his behalf. Lawrence Nana Asiamah Hanson who owns Bullhaus Entertainment is also involved in this controversy and threatened court action against Appietus. Appietus also threatened to take court action against Papi 5Five for allegedly defaming him.

Group members go solo 
Papi Adabraka was the first member of 5Five to go solo in 2022 after he claimed they had a challenge that they were able to resolve. But after doing that they all had to go their separate ways since none of others where interested in pursuing music further. Killy on the other hand has rebranded his name and is now known as Quasi Flava.

References

External links 
 Twitter
 Facebook

Ghanaian musicians
Ghanaian hip hop musicians
Musical groups established in 2008